Clermont is a commune in the Oise department in northern France. Clermont-de-l'Oise station has rail connections to Amiens, Creil and Paris.

History

Clermont was also known as Clermont-en-Beauvaisis or Clermont-de-l'Oise. The town is built on a hill surmounted by a 14th century keep. It is the relic of a fortress that was used as a penitentiary for women. The church dates from the 14th to the 16th centuries. The hôtel-de-ville, built by King Charles IV, who was born in Clermont in 1294, is the oldest in the north of France.

The town was probably founded during the time of the Norman invasions, and was an important military post, during the middle ages. It was repeatedly taken and retaken by the contending parties during the Hundred Years' War, and the Wars of Religion, In 1615 Henry II., prince of Condé, was besieged and captured there by the marshal d’Ancre.

Population

Sights
 Church St Samson (12th, 14th and 16th centuries) containing numerous Painting from the seventeenth century
 Dungeon of Clermont, 12th century
 fortified town hall, 14th century
 Subprefecture, 15th century
 Lardieres chapel, 17th century
 Chatellier Park and view on the north of the town
 Faÿ Wood

International relations
It is twinned with:
  Sudbury, United Kingdom
  Chiaramonte Gulfi, Italy

See also
 Communes of the Oise department
 List of counts of Clermont-en-Beauvaisis
 Artist Seraphine Louis, 1888-1942

References

Communes of Oise
Subprefectures in France